was a district located in Fukui Prefecture, Japan.

Towns and villages
Prior to its dissolution, the district only consisted of one town:

History

The district was first established in 1878, with a county office in Fukui Sakae-cho that governed both Asuwa and Yoshida Districts.

District Timeline

Recent mergers
 On February 1, 2006 - The town of Miyama, along with the town of Shimizu and the village of Koshino (both from Nyū District) were merged into the expanded city of Fukui. Therefore, Asuwa District was dissolved as a result of this merger.

See also
 List of dissolved municipalities of Japan

References 

Asuwa District